The 1954–55 National Football League was the 24th staging of the National Football League (NFL), an annual Gaelic football tournament for the Gaelic Athletic Association county teams of Ireland.

Dublin beat Meath in the first all-Leinster final.

Format 
A rob robin system as usual.

League Tables

Division I (Dr Lagan Cup)

Final

Division II

Division III

Division IV

First-place play-off

Cork advance to knockout stages

Knockout stages

Semi-finals

Final

References

National Football League
National Football League
National Football League (Ireland) seasons